Charles Francis Reisner (March 14, 1887 – September 24, 1962) was an American film director and actor of the 1920s and 1930s.

The German-American directed over 60 films between 1920 and 1950 and acted in over 20 films between 1916 and 1929. He starred with Charlie Chaplin in A Dog's Life in 1918 and The Kid in 1921.

He directed Buster Keaton (Keaton also co-directed it with him) in Steamboat Bill, Jr. (1928). During the late 1920s, through the 1940s, Reisner was under contract to Metro-Goldwyn-Mayer. In 1930, he directed Chasing Rainbows, a musical which starred  Bessie Love and Charles King. He directed The Big Store (1941), the Marx Brothers' last film for MGM.

Reisner died of a heart attack in La Jolla, California in 1962 at the age of 75.

Filmography

As actor
 A Dog's Life (1918)
 The Kid (1921)
 The Pilgrim (1923)
 Hollywood (1923)
 Her Temporary Husband (1923)
 Breaking Into Society (1923)
 Fight and Win (1924)
 A Self-Made Failure (1924)
 Justice of the Far North (1925)

As director

 The Man on the Box (1925)
 Oh! What a Nurse! (1926)
 The Better 'Ole (1926)
 What Every Girl Should Know (1927)
 The Missing Link (1927)
 The Fortune Hunter (1927)
 Steamboat Bill, Jr. (1928)
 Fools for Luck (1928)
 Brotherly Love (1928)
 China Bound (1929)
 Noisy Neighbors (1929)
 The Hollywood Revue of 1929 (1929)
 Chasing Rainbows (1930)
 Caught Short (1930)
 Love in the Rough (1930)
 The March of Time (1930)
 Reducing (1931)
 Stepping Out (1931)
 Politics (1931)
 Flying High (1931)
 Divorce in the Family (1932)
 The Chief (1933)
 Whistling in the Dark (1933)
 You Can't Buy Everything (1934)
 The Show-Off (1934)
 Student Tour (1934)
 The Winning Ticket (1935)
 It's in the Air (1935)
 Everybody Dance (1936)
 Murder Goes to College (1937)
 Sophie Lang Goes West (1937)
 Manhattan Merry-Go-Round (1937)
 Winter Carnival (1939)
 The Big Store (1941)
 This Time for Keeps (1942)
 Harrigan's Kid (1943)
 Meet the People (1943)
 Lost in a Harem (1944)
 In This Corner (1948)
 The Cobra Strikes (1948)
 The Traveling Saleswoman (1950)

External links

1887 births
1962 deaths
American male film actors
American male silent film actors
American male screenwriters
Male actors from Minneapolis
20th-century American male actors
Film directors from Minnesota
Screenwriters from Minnesota
20th-century American male writers
20th-century American screenwriters